Manuel Díaz Vega (born 1 September 1954 in Salas, Asturias) is a Spanish retired football referee. He officiated one match in both the 1994 FIFA World Cup and UEFA Euro 1996. He also refereed the 1996 UEFA Champions League Final between Juventus and Ajax.

References
Profile

1954 births
Spanish football referees
UEFA Champions League referees
FIFA World Cup referees
Living people
1994 FIFA World Cup referees
UEFA Euro 1996 referees